Ponta Varandinha is a headland and the westernmost point of the island of Boa Vista, Cape Verde. To its north lies the beach Praia da Varandinha. The nearest village is Povoação Velha, 5 km to the east. There is a lighthouse on the cape.

References

Headlands of Cape Verde
Geography of Boa Vista, Cape Verde